Koas Krala may refer to:

Koas Krala District
Koas Krala (commune)
Koas Krala (village)